The 1994 Hammersmith and Fulham Borough Council election took place on 5 May 1994 to elect members of Hammersmith and Fulham London Borough Council in London, England. The whole council was up for election and the Labour Party regained overall control of the council, which it had lost during the previous council term.

Background
The Labour Party had won overall control of the council at the previous election in 1990, with 28 out of the 50 seats. However, by the time of the 1994 election, the defection of two Labour councillors from the party (while remaining councillors) and the resignation of three other Labour councillors from their seats (which remained vacant on the eve of polling day) meant that by the end of the previous council's term, Labour held just 23 of the 47 occupied seats, with the Conservatives on 22 and 2 independents; the council was therefore under no overall control.

Election result
The Labour Party won 33 seats - a gain of five seats from the 1990 result, and restored their control of the council.

The Conservative Party won 15 seats - a loss of 7 seats from their previous result.

The Liberal Democrats won a single seat in the Eel Brook ward on election night with Alexandra Sugden - the other seat going to Labour's Bill Dann by a single vote over Simon Thompson for the Lib Dems. But a subsequent case in the High Court concerning the validity of an individual ballot resulted in Mr Thompson gaining a vote and becoming tied with Mr Dann for the second seat.  The drawing of lots was required to separate the tied candidates, in which Simon Thompson was the lucky winner.  This meant the Lib Dems gained two seats from the previous election.

Ward results

Addison

Avonmore

Broadway

Brook Green

Colehill

College Park and Old Oak

Coningham

Crabtree

Eel Brook

Gibbs Green

Grove

Margravine

Normand

Palace

Ravenscourt

Sands End

Sherbrooke

Starch Green

Sulivan

Town

Walham

White City and Shepherds Bush

Wormholt

References

1994
1994 London Borough council elections
20th century in the London Borough of Hammersmith and Fulham